The 1929 Cork Intermediate Hurling Championship was the 20th staging of the Cork Intermediate Hurling Championship since its establishment by the Cork County Board.

Ballincollig won the championship following a 2-2 to 0-0 defeat of Buttevant in the final. This was their second championship title overall and their first since 1912.

Results

Final

References

Cork Intermediate Hurling Championship
Cork Intermediate Hurling Championship